Morris Zimerman (8 June 1911 – 10 January 1992) was a South African rugby union player.

Biography
Zimerman grew up in Jansenville and studied law at the University of Cape Town after school.

Zimerman was the first Jew to represent  in rugby union, when he debuted on  5 December 1931. He played in three further tests for South Africa and also in fourteen tour matches, in which he scored thirteen tries.

After his playing days he became involved in rugby administration and became the convenor of the SA Selection Committee. He was the cousin of Louis Babrow, another Jewish Springbok.

Test history

See also
List of South Africa national rugby union players – Springbok no. 212

References

External links
 Morris Zimerman on scrum.com
 The Glory of the Game about the Ten Jewish Springboks.
 Rugby Personalities: The Jewish Springboks

1911 births
1992 deaths
Jewish rugby union players
Jewish South African sportspeople
People from Dr Beyers Naudé Local Municipality
South Africa international rugby union players
South African rugby union players
Rugby union players from the Eastern Cape
Rugby union wings
Golden Lions players